Bruno Alexandre Vieira Almeida (born 2 December 1997), known as Xadas , is a Portuguese professional footballer who plays for C.S. Marítimo as a midfielder.

Club career

Braga
Born in Oliveira de Azeméis, Metropolitan Area of Porto, Xadas inherited his unusual nickname through his father and grandfather. He passed through the ranks of FC Porto and A.D. Sanjoanense before arriving at S.C. Braga in 2014. He made his professional debut for the latter club's reserves in the LigaPro on 2 April 2016 in a 2–1 away loss against S.C. Freamunde, playing the final 30 minutes as a substitute for Pedro Alves and receiving a yellow card in added time.

In 2016–17, Xadas scored 11 goals in 30 matches for the B team, including both on 28 September 2016 as they came from behind to draw 2–2 at home to C.D. Aves. The following 1 April, he was called up for the first team for their match against C.S. Marítimo; he made his Primeira Liga debut in this game the following day, playing the final four minutes in place of Artur Jorge in a 3–3 draw at the Estádio Municipal de Braga, and had three more appearances over the remainder of the season.

After the dismissal of manager Jorge Simão, Xadas became a regular starter under successor Abel Ferreira, who knew him from the reserve side. He scored a first top-flight goal on 13 August 2017, to equalise in a 2–1 win at home over Portimonense SC.

Marítimo
On 31 January 2020, Xadas was loaned to Marítimo until the end of the campaign. He scored once during his time in Madeira, the game's only on 3 July away to C.D. Santa Clara, from a free kick.

Xadas went on loan to Royal Excel Mouscron of the Belgian First Division A in October 2020. At its conclusion, he signed a three-year deal at Marítimo, with Braga retaining 60% of his economic rights. In one of his first games back on 22 August 2021, he scored with the outside of his boot from distance to earn a 1–1 draw at home to Porto.

International career
At the 2017 FIFA U-20 World Cup in South Korea, Xadas played all five games of a quarter-final run for Portugal. He scored twice in a 3–1 win over the hosts in the last 16 at Cheonan Stadium.

Honours
Braga
Taça da Liga: 2019–20

References

External links

Portuguese League profile 

1997 births
Living people
People from Oliveira de Azeméis
Sportspeople from Aveiro District
Portuguese footballers
Association football midfielders
Primeira Liga players
Liga Portugal 2 players
A.D. Sanjoanense players
S.C. Braga B players
S.C. Braga players
C.S. Marítimo players
Belgian Pro League players
Royal Excel Mouscron players
Portugal youth international footballers
Portugal under-21 international footballers
Portuguese expatriate footballers
Expatriate footballers in Belgium
Portuguese expatriate sportspeople in Belgium